The Breakfast Club is a 1985 American teen coming-of-age comedy-drama film written, produced, and directed by John Hughes. It stars Emilio Estevez, Paul Gleason, Anthony Michael Hall, Judd Nelson, Molly Ringwald, and Ally Sheedy. The film tells the story of five teenagers from different high school cliques who serve a Saturday detention overseen by their authoritarian vice-principal.

The Breakfast Club premiered in Los Angeles on February 7, 1985, and was theatrically released by Universal Pictures on February 15, 1985. It grossed $51.5 million against a $1 million budget, and earned acclaim from critics, who consider it to be one of Hughes's most memorable and recognizable works. The media subsequently referred to the film's five main actors as members of a group called the "Brat Pack". In 2015, the film was digitally remastered and was re-screened in 430 theaters in celebration of its 30th anniversary.

In 2016, The Breakfast Club was selected for preservation in the United States National Film Registry by the Library of Congress as being "culturally, historically, or aesthetically significant".

Plot

On Saturday, March 24, 1984, five students at Shermer High School report at 7:00 a.m. for an all-day detention: socially awkward Brian Johnson, volatile wrestler Andrew Clark, shy loner Allison Reynolds, popular snob Claire Standish, and rebellious delinquent John Bender. In voiceover, the five are described respectively as "a brain, an athlete, a basket case, a princess, and a criminal".

They gather in the school library, where Vice Principal Richard Vernon warns them not to talk, move from their seats, or sleep until they are released at 4:00 p.m.; he assigns them a thousand-word essay, in which each must describe "who you think you are". He leaves, returning only occasionally to check on and reprimand them.

John ignores the rules and spends most of his time bullying or harassing Claire, Brian, and Andrew. Having a completely hostile relationship with the principal, John defiantly talks back to and insults Vernon, which results in John receiving eight weekends' worth of additional detention. Shortly after, the five sneak out of the library to retrieve John's marijuana stash. When they see Vernon is returning to the library, John deliberately gets caught while the others sneak back in. John is locked in a storage closet as punishment, but he escapes and returns to the library by crawling through the ceiling panels then falling through them into the library. Vernon investigates and the others help John hide and make up reasons for the noise.

The students pass the time by talking, arguing, listening to music, and smoking marijuana. Gradually, they open up and reveal their secrets and their poor relationships with their parents. Claire's popularity subjects her to intense peer pressure, and her parents use her to get back at each other during arguments. She is in detention due to skipping school to go shopping. John's father is physically and verbally abusive to him and his mother and, according to Vernon, is in detention for pulling a false fire alarm. Andrew is unable to think for himself as his father intimidates him to succeed in wrestling and view any form of weakness with contempt. He was sent to detention for taping another weaker student's buttocks together in order to look superior and win his father's approval. Brian is under such pressure from his parents to get good grades that he contemplated suicide after getting an F in shop class. He was sent to detention for bringing a flare gun to school for that purpose and his parents are not bothered by this attempt. Allison is a compulsive liar with neglectful parents and constantly steals random items for usage should she ever decide to run away from home. She admits that she merely showed up to detention for lack of anything better to do. They all realize that, despite their differences, they face similar problems.

Meanwhile, Vernon complains to the janitor, Carl, that students today are less disciplined than they were earlier in his teaching career. Carl tells Vernon that he is the only one who has changed and that the students don't care what he thinks of them.

Claire gives Allison a makeover, which sparks romantic interest from Andrew. Claire decides to break her "pristine" innocent appearance by kissing John. Although suspecting their new relationships will end when detention is over, they believe their mutual experiences will change the way they look at their peers in the sense that they won't look at a person the same way ever again.

As the detention nears its end, the group requests that Brian complete the assigned essay for everyone and John returns to the storage closet, so Vernon thinks he never left. Brian leaves the essay in the library for Vernon to read after they leave. As the students part ways, Allison and Andrew kiss, as do Claire and John. Allison rips Andrew's state championship patch from his jacket to keep and Claire gives John one of her diamond earrings.

As Vernon reads the essay, Brian writes how the principal has used stereotypes to make petty judgements of them and states that "each one of us is a brain, an athlete, a basket case, a princess, and a criminal. Does that answer your question?" He signs the essay with "Sincerely yours, the Breakfast Club." As he walks home through the school's football field, John triumphantly pumps his fist in the air.

Cast

 Emilio Estevez as Andrew Clark, an "Athlete" who was sentenced to Saturday detention for taping Larry Lester's butt cheeks together. His father intimidates him into winning at everything and mistreat those weaker than himself. 
 Paul Gleason as Vice Principal Richard Vernon, the domineering vice-principal of Shermer High School who oversees the Saturday detention. He is combative towards the students, particularly John, and judges them based on their social stereotypes.
 Anthony Michael Hall as Brian Johnson, a "Brain" who was sentenced to Saturday detention for bringing a flare gun that was to be used in a suicide attempt. His parents’ constant forcing of him to get good grades drove him to this attempt.
 John Kapelos as Carl Reed, a janitor at Shermer High School who appears to be on friendly terms with Brian.
 Judd Nelson as John Bender, a "Criminal" who was sentenced to Saturday detention for pulling the fire alarm and is the most argumentative towards Vernon. He has a physically and verbally abusive father who burned him on the arm with a cigar for spilling paint in the garage.
 Molly Ringwald as Claire Standish, a "Princess" who was sentenced to Saturday detention for skipping school so that she can go shopping. Her parents, on the verge of divorce, endlessly use her to get back at each other during arguments.
 Ally Sheedy as Allison Reynolds, a "Basket Case" who wasn't sentenced to Saturday detention and only attended as she couldn't find anything better to do. Her parents neglect her which drives her to consider running away from home.
 Ron Dean as Mr. Clark, the father of Andrew who constantly pressures him to not “blow his ride”.
 Mercedes Hall as Mrs. Johnson, the strict mother of Brian who pressures him to do well in his tests and appears unsympathetic to her son's suicide attempt. 
 Mary Christian as Brian's sister.
 Tim Gamble as Mr. Standish, the condescending father of Claire.
 Perry Crawford as Mr. Reynolds, the neglectful father of Allison.
 Fran Gargano as Mrs. Reynolds, the neglectful mother of Allison.
 John Hughes as Mr. Johnson (uncredited cameo), the father of Brian.

Production

Casting
Molly Ringwald and Anthony Michael Hall both starred in Hughes's 1984 film Sixteen Candles. Towards the end of filming, Hughes asked them both to be in The Breakfast Club. Hall became the first to be cast, agreeing to the role of Brian Johnson; his real life mother and sister playing the same roles in the film. Ringwald was originally approached to play the character of Allison Reynolds, but she was "really upset" because she wanted to play Claire Standish (then named "Cathy" in the first draft of the script), which saw the auditions of Robin Wright, Jodie Foster, Diane Lane and Laura Dern. She eventually convinced Hughes and the studio to give her the part. The role of Allison ultimately went to Ally Sheedy.

Emilio Estevez was originally cast in the role of John Bender. However, when Hughes was unable to find someone to play Andrew Clark, Estevez was recast. Nicolas Cage was considered for the role of John Bender, which was the last role to be cast, though the role was narrowed down to John Cusack and Judd Nelson. Hughes originally cast Cusack, but decided to replace him with Nelson before shooting began, because Cusack did not look intimidating enough for the role. At one point, Hughes was disappointed in Nelson because he stayed in character and harassed Ringwald off-camera, with the other actors having to convince Hughes to not fire him.

Rick Moranis was originally cast as the janitor but left due to creative differences and was replaced by John Kapelos.

Filming
In 1999, Hughes said that his request to direct the film met with resistance and skepticism because he lacked filmmaking experience. Hughes ultimately convinced the film's investors that due to the modest $1 million budget and its single-location shoot he could greatly minimize their risk. Hughes originally thought that The Breakfast Club would be his directorial debut. Hughes opted for an insular, largely one-room set and wrote about high school students, who would be played by younger actors.

Principal photography began on March 28, 1984, and ended in May. Filming took place at Maine North High School in Des Plaines, Illinois, which had been closed in May 1981. The same setting was used for interior scenes of Hughes's 1986 film Ferris Bueller's Day Off, which featured exterior shots from nearby Glenbrook North High School. The library at Maine North High School, considered too small for the film, prompted the crew to build a virtually identical but larger set in the school's gymnasium. The actors rehearsed for three weeks and then shot the film in sequence. On the Ferris Bueller's Day Off DVD commentary (featured on the 2004 DVD version), Hughes revealed that he shot the two films concurrently to save time and money, and some outtakes of both films feature elements of the film crews working on the other film. The first print was 150 minutes in length.

During a cast reunion in honor of the film's 25th anniversary, Ally Sheedy revealed that a Director's Cut existed but Hughes's widow did not disclose any details concerning its whereabouts.

In 2015, the first draft of the film's script was discovered in a Maine South High School cabinet as district employees were moving offices to a new building.

Poster
The film's poster, featuring the five characters huddled together, was photographed by Annie Leibovitz toward the end of shooting. The shot of five actors gazing at the camera influenced the way teen films were marketed from that point on. The poster refers to the five "types" of the story using slightly different terms than those used in the film, and in a different sequence, stating "They were five total strangers with nothing in common, meeting for the first time. A brain, a beauty, a jock, a rebel and a recluse".

The Breakfast Club poster "family shot", notably including Bender's raised fist, was satirized in the poster for the comedy-horror film, The Texas Chainsaw Massacre 2. It also inspired the title page of chapter 29 of the manga series, Akane-banashi.

Themes
The main theme of the film is the constant struggle of the American teenager to be understood, by adults and by themselves. It explores the pressure put on teenagers to fit into their own realms of high school social constructs, as well as the lofty expectations of their parents, teachers, and other authority figures. On the surface, the students have little in common with each other. However, as the day rolls on, they eventually bond over a common disdain for the aforementioned issues of peer pressure and parental expectations. Stereotyping is another theme. Once the obvious stereotypes are broken down, the characters "empathize with each other's struggles, dismiss some of the inaccuracies of their first impressions, and discover that they are more similar than different".

The main adult character, Mr. Vernon, is not portrayed in a positive light. He consistently talks down to the students and forcefully flaunts his authority throughout the film. Bender is the only one who stands up to Vernon.

Hughes would use the Shermer High School setting for Weird Science later in the same year.

Release
The film premiered in Los Angeles on February 7, 1985. Universal Pictures released the film in cinemas on February 15, 1985, in the United States.

Home media
The Breakfast Club was first released on VHS and LaserDisc.

In 2003, the film was released on DVD as part of the "High School Reunion Collection". In 2008, a "Flashback Edition" DVD was released with several special features, including an audio commentary with Anthony Michael Hall and Judd Nelson. A 25th Anniversary Edition Blu-ray was released in 2010, and the same disc was re-released with a DVD and digital copy in 2012 as part of Universal's 100th Anniversary series. On March 10, 2015, the 30th Anniversary Edition was released. This release was digitally remastered and restored from the original 35mm film negatives for better picture quality on DVD, Digital HD and Blu-ray.

The Criterion Collection released a special edition 2-disc DVD set and a Blu-ray disc on January 2, 2018. The transfer was the same as the previous release but included new features such as fifty-minutes of new deleted and extended scenes, an Electronic Press Kit, new and archival interviews, a 1985 excerpt of the Today program, a new video essay and an episode of This American Life.

Reception

Critical response
Roger Ebert awarded three stars out of four and called the performances "wonderful", adding that the film was "more or less predictable" but "doesn't need earthshaking revelations; it's about kids who grow willing to talk to one another, and it has a surprisingly good ear for the way they speak." Gene Siskel of the Chicago Tribune gave the film three-and-a-half stars out of four and wrote, "This confessional formula has worked in films as different as Who's Afraid of Virginia Woolf?, The Big Chill, and My Dinner with Andre and it works here too. It works especially well in The Breakfast Club because we keep waiting for the film to break out of its claustrophobic set and give us a typical teenage movie sex-or-violence scene. That doesn't happen, much to our delight." Kathleen Carroll from the New York Daily News stated, "Hughes has a wonderful knack for communicating the feelings of teenagers, as well as an obvious rapport with his exceptional cast–who deserve top grades."

Other reviews were less positive. Janet Maslin of The New York Times wrote, "There are some good young actors in The Breakfast Club, though a couple of them have been given unplayable roles", namely Ally Sheedy and Judd Nelson, adding, "The five young stars would have mixed well even without the fraudulent encounter-group candor towards which The Breakfast Club forces them. Mr. Hughes, having thought up the characters and simply flung them together, should have left well enough alone." James Harwood of Variety panned the film as a movie that "will probably pass as deeply profound among today's teenage audience, meaning the youngsters in the film spend most of their time talking to each other instead of dancing, dropping their drawers and throwing food. This, on the other hand, should not suggest they have anything intelligent to say."

Among retrospective reviews, James Berardinelli wrote in 1998: "Few will argue that The Breakfast Club is a great film, but it has a candor that is unexpected and refreshing in a sea of too-often generic teen-themed films. The material is a little talky (albeit not in a way that will cause anyone to confuse it with something by Éric Rohmer), but it's hard not to be drawn into the world of these characters."

On the review aggregator website Rotten Tomatoes, the film holds an approval rating of 89% based on 64 reviews, with an average rating of 7.8/10. The website's critics consensus reads, "The Breakfast Club is a warm, insightful, and very funny look into the inner lives of teenagers". Review aggregator Metacritic assigned the film a weighted average score of 66/100 based on 25 reviews from mainstream critics, considered to be "generally favorable reviews".

Writing in 2015, P. J. O'Rourke called The Breakfast Club and Ferris Bueller's Day Off "Hughes's masterwork[s]". He described the former film as an example of Hughes's politics, in that the students do not organize a protest but, "like good conservatives do, as individuals and place the highest value, like this conservative does, on goofing off. Otherwise known as individual liberty."

Box office
In February 1985, the film debuted at No. 3 at the box office (behind Beverly Hills Cop and Witness). Grossing $45,875,171 domestically and $51,525,171 worldwide, the film was a box office success, given its $1 million budget.

Accolades
Anthony Michael Hall, Judd Nelson, Molly Ringwald, Paul Gleason and Ally Sheedy all won a Silver Bucket of Excellence Award at the 2005 MTV Movie Awards.

Legacy
The Breakfast Club has been called the quintessential 1980s film. In 2008, Empire magazine ranked it at number 369 on their The 500 Greatest Movies of All Time list. It later ranked at number 38 on their 2014 list. Similarly, The New York Times placed the film on its Best 1000 Movies Ever list and Entertainment Weekly ranked the film number 1 on its list of the 50 Best High School Movies. In the 2001 parody film Not Another Teen Movie, Gleason reprised his role as Assistant Principal Vernon in a short scene that parodies The Breakfast Club.

In 2005, the film received the Silver Bucket of Excellence Award in honor of its 20th anniversary at the MTV Movie Awards. For the event, MTV attempted to reunite the original cast. Sheedy, Ringwald, and Hall appeared together on stage, with Kapelos in the audience; Gleason gave the award to his former castmates. Estevez could not attend because of other commitments, and Nelson appeared earlier in the show but left before the on-stage reunion, prompting Hall to joke that the two were "in Africa with Dave Chappelle". Yellowcard performed Simple Minds' anthem for the film, "Don't You (Forget About Me)", at the awards. At the 82nd Academy Awards (March 7, 2010), Sheedy, Hall, Ringwald, and Nelson all appeared in a tribute to John Hughes—who had died the prior year—along with other actors who had worked with him, including Jon Cryer from Pretty in Pink, Matthew Broderick from Ferris Bueller's Day Off, and Macaulay Culkin from Home Alone. In 2012, Victorious aired their own version of the film, titled 'The Breakfast Bunch'.

In 2018, The New Yorker published an article written by Ringwald in which she critiqued Hughes's films "in the age of #MeToo", beginning with a discussion of how she explained to her ten-year-old daughter what happened in the scene when her character seems to be sexually-assaulted under a desk. The essay provoked some to claim that Ringwald was criticising the director who made her into a film star, but she was defended by Jenny Han for a "tender, fair-minded piece".

Soundtrack

The film's soundtrack, The Breakfast Club (Original Motion Picture Soundtrack), was produced by British pop musician Keith Forsey and released on February 19, 1985, by A&M Records. The album peaked at No. 17 on the US Billboard 200 album chart. The song "Don't You (Forget About Me)" performed by Scottish rock band Simple Minds was released on February 20, 1985, in the United States and on April 8, 1985, in the United Kingdom as a single and reached No. 1 on the Billboard Hot 100.

Track listing

Overview 
The album contains ten songs that are played partially throughout the movie, performed by bands and singers of the rock and new wave genre, including three instrumental songs by record producer Keith Forsey.

Simple Minds's international hit "Don't You (Forget About Me)" is played in the opening and closing credits. A music video was made for this song and for Wang Chung's "Fire in the Twilight" (reached No 110 on the US  Billboard Hot 100).

Not included on the soundtrack is the "Colonel Bogey March" that the students are whistling when Principal Vernon walks into the room.

Critical reception 
The soundtrack received generally negative reviews. In a June 25, 1985 review for The Village Voice, music critic Robert Christgau gave the album a "D−" and said that it has "utterly negligible" songs, and he commended Simple Minds for trying to distance themselves from their song, "Don't You (Forget About Me)", best known for being played during the film's opening and closing credits. In a retrospective review for AllMusic, Stephen Thomas Erlewine gave the soundtrack three out of five stars and wrote that, apart from Simple Minds' "undisputed masterpiece," the album is largely "disposable" and marred by "'80s artifacts" and "forgettable instrumentals".

References

Further reading

External links

 
 
 
 
 
 
 
 The Breakfast Club: Smells Like Teen Realness – an essay by David Kamp at The Criterion Collection

The Breakfast Club
1985 films
1985 comedy-drama films
1985 soundtrack albums
1980s American films
1980s coming-of-age comedy-drama films
1980s English-language films
1980s high school films
1980s teen comedy-drama films
A&M Films films
A&M Records soundtracks
American coming-of-age comedy-drama films
American high school films
American teen comedy-drama films
Comedy film soundtracks
Drama film soundtracks
Films about juvenile delinquency
Films directed by John Hughes (filmmaker)
Films produced by John Hughes (filmmaker)
Films set in 1984
Films set in Illinois
Films set in libraries
Films shot in Illinois
Films with screenplays by John Hughes (filmmaker)
United States National Film Registry films
Universal Pictures films